Ryan Robinson may refer to:

 Ryan Robinson (English footballer) (born 1982), English football goalkeeper
 Ryan Robinson (cricketer) (born 1976), English cricketer
 Ryan Robinson (American football) (born 1990), American football defensive end
 Ryan Robinson (Canadian soccer) (born 2001), Canadian soccer player